Orsini Carota (active 16th-century) was an Italian painter of the Renaissance period, active in Perugia.

Biography
Born in Assisi, he was a pupil of the painter Pompeo Cocchi. He was active in 1583.

References

Year of birth unknown
Year of death unknown
People from Perugia
Umbrian painters
16th-century Italian painters
Italian male painters
Italian Renaissance painters